Ian Cedric Audley Player DMS (15 March 1927 – 30 November 2014) was a South African international conservationist.

Biography
Born in Johannesburg, Player was educated at St. John's College, Johannesburg, Union of South Africa and served in the 6th Armoured Division attached to the American 5th Army in Italy 1944–46.

Player's conservation career started with the Natal Parks Board in 1952 and whilst Warden of the Umfolozi Game Reserve, he spearheaded two key initiatives:
 Operation Rhino - that saved the few remaining southern race of white rhino.
 Protected status for the Umfolozi and St. Lucia Wilderness Areas (now known as the iSimangaliso Wetland Park World Heritage Site)- The first wilderness areas to be zoned in South Africa and on the African continent.

Player was the Founder of the Wilderness Leadership School, which still runs the original wilderness trails to this day.
 This led to the formation of the Wild Foundation, the Wilderness Foundation SA, Wilderness Foundation UK, Magqubu Ntombela Foundation not to mention the World Wilderness Congresses, first convened in 1977.

In 2004 Player collaborated with Sarah Collins, entrepreneur, visionary, and women's rights activist, to create ‘Take Back The Future’. The objective was to tempt mainstream South African youth into this arena of wilderness preservation. ‘Take Back The Future’ raised money through selling earth worms, and growing and selling vegetables at farmer's markets. By setting up youth groups they were able to innovate and upscale the concept across communities in South Africa.

Amongst many orders and awards, Player was awarded the Knight of the Order of the Golden Ark and the Decoration for Meritorious Service (the then highest Republic of South African civilian award). He was the recipient of two honorary doctorates:

 Doctor of Philosophy, Honoris Causa from the University of Natal.
 Doctor of Laws (LLD) (h.c.) from Rhodes University.

Player died on 30 November 2014 of a stroke. He was the brother of professional golfer Gary Player.

Player's archives and legacy are owned and managed by his nephew Marc Player, who has initiated several projects including books (Into the River of Life) a feature-length movie, a TV series built around Operation Rhino translocation program and THE PLAYER INDABA which seeks global "PLAYERS' to raise funds to fight the extinction of various threatened animal species.The Ian Player Foundation has also been established as a charitable organization aiding nature conservation, wildlife activism and environmental education.

Popular culture

The famous movie director and producer Howard Hawks, wanted a movie about people who catch animals in Africa for zoos, a dangerous profession with exciting scenes the likes of which had never been seen on-screen before. The name of his blockbuster movie is Hatari!, starring John Wayne. Hawks increased his knowledge in catching animals from Player's humane work. In 1952 South Africa was disastrously embarked to eliminate all large wild animals to protect livestock, and only 300 white rhinos survived. Player then started his famed rhino catching technique to relocate and save the white rhinos. Player's humane project was called Operation Rhino and the renowned film documentary named Operation Rhino was produced. Hawks studied this film documentary repeatedly to help incorporate aspects of it into his film Hatari!.

In June 1964, Player appeared on the panel show To Tell the Truth as himself, highlighting his role as warden of Hluhluwe–Imfolozi Park and his work protecting white rhinos. Host Bud Collyer noted that scenes of white rhinos shown at the beginning of the episode were from Ivan Tors' movie Rhino!, released a few weeks earlier, and for which Player acted as a technical advisor.

Selected works
 Men, Rivers and Canoes – 1964 - Reissued 2007 - 
 White Rhino Saga – 1972 - 
 Big Game – 1972 - ASIN: B0007BO5E4
 Man and the Wilderness – 1986 - ASIN: B0007BQ0FG
 Zululand Wilderness: Shadow and Soul – 1997 -  - archive
 Ian Player Perspective, stories by and about Dr. Ian Player

References

External links
 http://www.ianplayerfoundation.com 
 WILD Foundation
 Wilderness Foundation SA
 Wilderness Foundation UK and articles about him on their blog
 Wilderness Leadership School

1927 births
2014 deaths
People from Johannesburg
South African conservationists
South African people of British descent
Alumni of St John's College (Johannesburg)